(Amos) Henry Chilver, Baron Chilver FRS FREng (30 October 1926 – 8 July 2012) was a British engineer and politician.

Early life and career
Chilver was born in Barking, Essex, to Amos Henry Chilver and his wife Annie E. Mack. After attending Southend High School for Boys he took up a place at the University of Bristol, where he gained a BSc in Mechanical Engineering in 1947. He gained a PhD in Civil Engineering in 1951, and a DSc in 1962. From 1952 to 1954 he was a lecturer at the University of Bristol, and between 1958 and 1961 he taught at Corpus Christi College, Cambridge. Between 1961 and 1969 he was Chadwick Professor of Civil Engineering at University College London. Between 1970 and 1989 he was Vice-Chancellor of Cranfield University.

In the early 1980s he was Chairman of the Northern Ireland Higher Education Review Group, which was tasked with producing a report called the Chilver Report on how to unify the Initial teacher education (ITE) used in Northern Ireland. He was the Chairman of the Post Office between 1980 and 1981. In 1983 he succeeded Lord Campbell as Chairman of the Milton Keynes Development Corporation (MKDC). Between 1992 and 1995 he was Chairman of English China Clays, and on 25 February 1993 he was appointed Chairman of RJB Mining. He has also been a director of ICI.

Awards
He was made a Fellow of the Royal Academy of Engineering in 1977 and the Royal Society in 1982. In 1978 he was made a Knight Bachelor. He held honorary DScs from the University of Leeds (1982), the University of Bristol (1983), the University of Salford, the University of Strathclyde (1986), the University of Buckingham, the University of Bath (1986) and the University of Technology of Compiègne.

In 1987 he was made a life peer as Baron Chilver, of Cranfield in the County of Bedfordshire, and he was introduced to the House of Lords on 15 July.

Personal life
In 1959 he married Dr Claudia Grigson, the sister of Christopher Grigson and they had five children: Helen, Sarah, John, Mark and Paul.

Published works
Problems in Engineering Structures with R S Ashby (1958)
Strength of Materials with J Case (1959)

See also
 University of Ulster – History

References

Bibliography

1926 births
2012 deaths
English civil engineers
Knights Bachelor
Conservative Party (UK) life peers
Fellows of the Royal Academy of Engineering
Fellows of the Royal Society
Presidents of the Smeatonian Society of Civil Engineers
Academics of Cranfield University
Academics of University College London
Fellows of Corpus Christi College, Cambridge
Alumni of the University of Bristol
People educated at Southend High School for Boys
People associated with Cranfield University
Chairmen of Post Office Limited
People from Barking, London
Life peers created by Elizabeth II